Tournefortia obtusiflora is a species of plant in the family Boraginaceae. It is endemic to Ecuador.  Its natural habitat is subtropical or tropical dry forests. It is threatened by habitat loss.

References

obtusiflora
Endemic flora of Ecuador
Critically endangered flora of South America
Taxa named by George Bentham
Taxonomy articles created by Polbot